Balaji Guttula (born 20 May 1979) is an Indian Chess Player holding FIDE Master and FIDE Trainer title. He achieved his peak rating of 2320 in 2005 and was conferred with the title of FIDE Master in 2009. He has coached and mentored many students like Kush Bhagat, Shiven Khosla, and Suhaani Lohia in a coaching career spanning over two decades. He founded South Mumbai Chess Academy in 1996 with his brother Durga Nagesh Guttula.

Early life and education 
Balaji Guttula was born on 20 May 1979 in Mumbai, Maharashtra, India, in a South Indian family. He did his primary schooling at AES School in Wadala. He then shifted to Rajahmundry, Andhra Pradesh. He returned to Mumbai after completing his 10th standard, according to his interview.
 
Balaji learned to play Chess from his neighbours accidentally, in Rajahmundry at the age of 11 and began participating in the tournaments at 15. He is a Director and the Chief Coach at South Mumbai Chess Academy, Mumbai.

Coaching career 
Balaji is a coach for competitive tournaments from nearly two decades and has accompanied the Indian Team as an official delegate to the Asian Schools Chess Championship held in Tashkent, Uzbekistan in 2019.

Balaji has trained over a hundred students some are listed.

 CM Kush Bhagat
 IM Shiven Khosla
 WCM Suhaani Lohia
 Bhaven Shah
 CM Advait Bagri
 AIM Siddhanth Lohia
 CM Rishab Shah
 Aditya Patil
 Adhvay Dhoot

References 

Indian chess players
Chess FIDE Masters
1979 births
Living people